"Country On" is a song by American country music singer Luke Bryan. It was released on July 5, 2022 as the lead single to Bryan's compilation album, Prayin' in a Deer Stand.

Content
"Country On" was co-written by Mark Nesler, David Frasier, Mitch Oglesby, and Styles Haury, and produced by Jeff Stevens and his son Jody. It was released in July 2022 as the lead single to Bryan's upcoming eighth studio album. On the song's lyrical themes, Bryan told the blog Music Mayhem, "It's got patriotism in it, it's got honoring people that keep us free and people that keep us safe and look after us. I think that's something the Country music crowd is always very, very appreciative of because so many in Country music are those people."

The song is described by Taste of Country as a "country rock anthem" with a lyrical theme of support for blue-collar workers. In addition to the song's release to radio, Bryan released a music video on August 15, 2022. Included in the video is footage of real-life firefighters, police officers, military members, and cowboys.

Charts

Weekly charts

Year-end charts

References

2022 singles
2022 songs
Luke Bryan songs
Songs written by David Frasier
Songs written by Mark Nesler
Capitol Records Nashville singles
Country music songs